In mathematics, computable numbers are the real numbers that can be computed to within any desired precision by a finite, terminating algorithm. They are also known as the recursive numbers, effective numbers or the computable reals or recursive reals. The concept of a computable real number was introduced by Emile Borel in 1912, using the intuitive notion of computability available at the time.

Equivalent definitions can be given using μ-recursive functions, Turing machines, or λ-calculus as the formal representation of algorithms. The computable numbers form a real closed field and can be used in the place of real numbers for many, but not all, mathematical purposes.

Informal definition using a Turing machine as example
In the following, Marvin Minsky defines the numbers to be computed in a manner similar to those defined by Alan Turing in 1936; i.e., as "sequences of digits interpreted as decimal fractions" between 0 and 1:
 

The key notions in the definition are (1) that some n is specified at the start, (2) for any n the computation only takes a finite number of steps, after which the machine produces the desired output and terminates.

An alternate form of (2) – the machine successively prints all n of the digits on its tape, halting after printing the nth – emphasizes Minsky's observation: (3) That by use of a Turing machine, a finite definition – in the form of the machine's state table – is being used to define what is a potentially infinite string of decimal digits.

This is however not the modern definition which only requires the result be accurate to within any given accuracy. The informal definition above is subject to a rounding problem called the table-maker's dilemma whereas the modern definition is not.

Formal definition
A real number a is computable if it can be approximated by some computable function  in the following manner: given any positive integer n, the function produces an integer f(n) such that:

There are two similar definitions that are equivalent:
There exists a computable function which, given any positive rational error bound , produces a rational number r such that 
There is a computable sequence of rational numbers  converging to  such that  for each i.

There is another equivalent definition of computable numbers via computable Dedekind cuts.

An example is given by a program D that defines the cube root of 3. Assuming  this is defined by:

A real number is computable if and only if there is a computable Dedekind cut D corresponding to it. The function D is unique for each computable number (although of course two different programs may provide the same function).

A complex number is called computable if its real and imaginary parts are computable.

Properties

Not computably enumerable
There are only countably many Turing machines, showing that the computable numbers are subcountable. The set  of these Gödel numbers, however, is not computably enumerable (and consequently, neither are subsets of  that are defined in terms of it). This is because there is no algorithm to determine which Gödel numbers correspond to Turing machines that produce computable reals. In order to produce a computable real, a Turing machine must compute a total function, but the corresponding decision problem is in Turing degree 0′′. Consequently, there is no surjective computable function from the natural numbers to the computable reals, and Cantor's diagonal argument cannot be used constructively to demonstrate uncountably many of them.

While the set of real numbers is uncountable, the set of computable numbers is classically countable and thus almost all real numbers are not computable. The inverse of this bijection is an injection into the natural numbers of the computable numbers, proving that they are countable. But, again, this subset is not computable, even though the computable reals are themselves ordered.

Properties as a field
The arithmetical operations on computable numbers are themselves computable in the sense that whenever real numbers a and b are computable then the following real numbers are also computable: a + b, a - b, ab, and a/b if b is nonzero.
These operations are actually uniformly computable; for example, there is a Turing machine which on input (A,B,) produces output r, where A is the description of a Turing machine approximating a, B is the description of a Turing machine approximating b, and r is an  approximation of a+b.

The fact that computable real numbers form a field was first proved by Henry Gordon Rice in 1954.

Computable reals however do not form a computable field, because the definition of a computable field requires effective equality.

Non-computability of the ordering
The order relation on the computable numbers is not computable. Let A be the description of a Turing machine approximating the number . Then there is no Turing machine which on input A outputs "YES" if  and "NO" if  To see why, suppose the machine described by A keeps outputting 0 as  approximations. It is not clear how long to wait before deciding that the machine will never output an approximation which forces a to be positive. Thus the machine will eventually have to guess that the number will equal 0, in order to produce an output; the sequence may later become different from 0. This idea can be used to show that the machine is incorrect on some sequences if it computes a total function. A similar problem occurs when the computable reals are represented as Dedekind cuts. The same holds for the equality relation : the equality test is not computable.

While the full order relation is not computable, the restriction of it to pairs of unequal numbers is computable.

Other properties
The computable real numbers do not share all the properties of the real numbers used in analysis. For example, the least upper bound of a bounded increasing computable sequence of computable real numbers need not be a computable real number. A sequence with this property is known as a Specker sequence, as the first construction is due to Ernst Specker in 1949. Despite the existence of counterexamples such as these, parts of calculus and real analysis can be developed in the field of computable numbers, leading to the study of computable analysis.

Every computable number is arithmetically definable, but not vice versa. There are many arithmetically definable, noncomputable real numbers, including:
any number that encodes the solution of the halting problem (or any other undecidable problem) according to a chosen encoding scheme.
Chaitin's constant, which is a type of real number that is Turing equivalent to the halting problem.
Both of these examples in fact define an infinite set of definable, uncomputable numbers, one for each Universal Turing machine.
A real number is computable if and only if the set of natural numbers it represents (when written in binary and viewed as a characteristic function) is computable.

The set of computable real numbers (as well as every countable, densely ordered subset of computable reals without ends) is order-isomorphic to the set of rational numbers.

Digit strings and the Cantor and Baire spaces

Turing's original paper defined computable numbers as follows:

(The decimal expansion of a only refers to the digits following the decimal point.)

Turing was aware that this definition is equivalent to the -approximation definition given above. The argument proceeds as follows: if a number is computable in the Turing sense, then it is also computable in the  sense: if , then the first n digits of the decimal expansion for a provide an  approximation of a. For the converse, we pick an  computable real number a and generate increasingly precise approximations until the nth digit after the decimal point is certain. This always generates a decimal expansion equal to a but it may improperly end in an infinite sequence of 9's in which case it must have a finite (and thus computable) proper decimal expansion.

The members of  can be identified with binary decimal expansions, but since the decimal expansions  and  denote the same real number, the interval  can only be bijectively (and homeomorphically under the subset topology) identified with the subset of  not ending in all 1's.

Note that this property of decimal expansions means that it is impossible to effectively identify the computable real numbers defined in terms of a decimal expansion and those defined in the  approximation sense. Hirst has shown that there is no algorithm which takes as input the description of a Turing machine which produces  approximations for the computable number a, and produces as output a Turing machine which enumerates the digits of a in the sense of Turing's definition. Similarly, it means that the arithmetic operations on the computable reals are not effective on their decimal representations as when adding decimal numbers. In order to produce one digit, it may be necessary to look arbitrarily far to the right to determine if there is a carry to the current location. This lack of uniformity is one reason why the contemporary definition of computable numbers uses  approximations rather than decimal expansions.

This leads to genuine differences in the computational properties. For instance the  satisfying , with  quantifier free, must be computable while the unique  satisfying a universal formula may have an arbitrarily high position in the hyperarithmetic hierarchy.

Use in place of the reals

The computable numbers include the specific real numbers which appear in practice, including all real algebraic numbers, as well as e, π, and many other transcendental numbers. Though the computable reals exhaust those reals we can calculate or approximate, the assumption that all reals are computable leads to substantially different conclusions about the real numbers. The question naturally arises of whether it is possible to dispose of the full set of reals and use computable numbers for all of mathematics. This idea is appealing from a constructivist point of view, and has been pursued by what Errett Bishop and Fred Richman call the Russian school of constructive mathematics. 

To actually develop analysis over computable numbers, some care must be taken. For example, if one uses the classical definition of a sequence, the set of computable numbers is not closed under the basic operation of taking the supremum of a bounded sequence (for example, consider a Specker sequence, see the section above). This difficulty is addressed by considering only sequences which have a computable modulus of convergence. The resulting mathematical theory is called computable analysis.

Implementations of exact arithmetic

Computer packages representing real numbers as programs computing approximations have been proposed as early as 1985, under the name "exact arithmetic". Modern examples include the CoRN library (Coq), and the RealLib package (C++). A related line of work is based on taking a real RAM program and running it with rational or floating-point numbers of sufficient precision, such as the iRRAM package.

See also
Constructible number
Definable number
Semicomputable function
Transcomputational problem

Notes

References

 Computable numbers (and Turing's a-machines) were introduced in this paper; the definition of computable numbers uses infinite decimal sequences.

Further reading

 This paper describes the development of the calculus over the computable number field.

 §1.3.2 introduces the definition by nested sequences of intervals converging to the singleton real. Other representations are discussed in §4.1.

Computability theory
Theory of computation